Carlos Arruza (February 17, 1920 – May 20, 1966), born Carlos Ruiz Camino, was one of the most prominent bullfighters of the 20th century.  He was known as "El Ciclón" ("the cyclone").

Arruza was born in Mexico to Spanish parents.  He began fighting bulls at age 14 in Mexico City, and moved to Spain in 1944.  He and Manolete were Spain's top matadors of the 1940s.

Arruza retired to a ranch outside Mexico City in 1953, but made a comeback as a rejoneador, fighting bulls from horseback.  He appeared in two Mexican films about bullfighting, and had a part in the 1960 John Wayne film The Alamo.  He was the subject of the 1971 documentary Arruza, directed by Budd Boetticher.  Arruza's sons, Manolo and Carlos Jr., also became prominent toreros.

Carlos Arruza died on May 20, 1966 in an automobile accident while on the road from Toluca, State of Mexico, to Mexico City.

Calle Carlos Arruza, a small street in downtown Tucson, Arizona, is named after Arruza. According to Arizona Daily Star historical writer David Leighton, it may be the only street in the U.S. named after a bullfighter.

The composition "Carlos", by jazz composer and bandleader Gerald Wilson, is dedicated to Arruza. The piece features virtuoso trumpet playing and has been recorded three times by Wilson's band: in 1966 with Jimmy Owens on trumpet, 1989 with Oscar Brashear, and 1995 with Ron Barrows.

Filmography

References

Other sources
  Encyclopædia Britannica entry
  Lyn Sherwood, Reflections on the Last ‘Golden Age’ And a Lament For The Current “Bronze Age”", La Prensa San Diego, Apr. 30, 2004
 
 Carlos Arruza at ToroPedia.com, the English language online encyclopedia of bullfighting.
  David Leighton, "Calle Carlos Arruza Named for Famed Mexican Matador," Arizona Daily Star, Aug. 14, 2012

1920 births
1966 deaths
Mexican male film actors
Mexican bullfighters
Road incident deaths in Mexico
Mexican people of Spanish descent
Male actors from Mexico City
Sportspeople from Mexico City
20th-century Mexican male actors
Mexican expatriates in Spain